The southern chestnut-tailed antbird (Sciaphylax hemimelaena) is a species of passerine bird in the family Thamnophilidae. It is found in the Amazon Rainforest in far southern Colombia, eastern Peru, northern Bolivia, and western and central Brazil.

The southern chestnut-tailed antbird was originally described by the English zoologist Philip Sclater in 1857 and given the binomial name Myrmeciza emimelaena. A molecular phylogenetic study published in 2013 found that the genus Myrmeciza, as then defined, was polyphyletic. In the resulting rearrangement to create monophyletic genera the southern chestnut-tailed antbird and the northern chestnut-tailed antbird were moved to a newly erected genus Sciaphylax.

References

southern chestnut-tailed antbird
Birds of the Amazon Basin
Birds of the Bolivian Amazon
Birds of the Ecuadorian Amazon
Birds of the Peruvian Amazon
southern chestnut-tailed antbird
southern chestnut-tailed antbird
Taxonomy articles created by Polbot